My Fake Boyfriend is a 2022 Canadian romantic comedy film written by Luke Albright, Greg Boaldin and Joe Wanjai Ross, directed by Rose Troche and starring Keiynan Lonsdale, Dylan Sprouse, and Sarah Hyland.

Cast
Keiynan Lonsdale as Andrew
Dylan Sprouse as Jake
Sarah Hyland as Kelly
Samer Salem as Rafi
Marcus Rosner as Nico
Karen Robinson as Lucille
Jaden Goetz as Cristiano
Rachel Risen as Emily
Dean McDermott as Famous Director
Simon Sinn as Mr. Jiang

Release
The film was released on Amazon Prime Video on June 17, 2022.

Reception
The film has a 67% rating on Rotten Tomatoes based on nine reviews.

Lena Wilson of The New York Times gave the film a positive review and wrote, "To set expectations, it’s best to think of My Fake Boyfriend as two movies."

Jayne Nelson of Radio Times awarded the film three stars out of five and wrote, "There are few surprises, but a watchable cast and a gentle, wry script work wonders to keep a tired old formula feel fresh."

Graeme Guttmann of Screen Rant awarded the film two and a half stars out of five and wrote, "Lonsdale carries this love story, even if it spends a little too much time focused on its outlandish premise and not enough time exploring the actual romance."

References

External links
 
 

Canadian romantic comedy films
English-language Canadian films
2022 romantic comedy films
2022 LGBT-related films
Canadian LGBT-related films
LGBT-related romantic comedy films
2020s English-language films
2020s Canadian films